Young Cream (Hangul: 영크림), is a South Korean rapper and producer. He made his debut as a solo artist with the single, "042" on January 9, 2017.

Biography

1990–2013: Early life and career beginnings 
Young Cream was born on February 14, 1990, in Daejeon, South Korea. He debuted as a member of M.I.B (band), under the label Jungle Entertainment on October 25, 2011, with the title track "G.D.M" aka "Girls, Drinks, Money."

2017: Solo career
After the news that M.I.B (band) disbanded Cream debuted solo with his single "042". Young Cream has released another song after "042", called "Better Know" featuring artist J-Boog.

Discography 
For Young Cream's work with M.I.B, see M.I.B's discography.

Singles

Filmography

Television series

References

External links 
 Official Website

People from Daejeon
Living people
South Korean male rappers
South Korean male idols
Year of birth missing (living people)